In the statistical physics of disordered systems, the random energy model is a toy model of a system with quenched disorder, such as a spin glass, having a first-order phase transition. Many properties of this model can be computed exactly. Its simplicity makes this model suitable for pedagogical introduction of concepts like quenched disorder and replica symmetry.

Comparison with other disordered systems
The -spin infinite-range model, in which all -spin sets interact with a random, independent, identically distributed interaction constant, becomes the random energy model in a suitably defined  limit.

More precisely, if the Hamiltonian of the model is defined by

 

where the sum runs over all  distinct sets of  indices, and, for each such set,  is an independent Gaussian variable of mean 0 and variance , the Random-Energy model is recovered in the  limit.

Derivation of thermodynamical quantities 
As its name suggests, in the REM each microscopic state has an independent distribution of energy. The final extensive variables like the free energy need to be averaged over all realizations of the disorder, just as in the case of the Edwards–Anderson model.

 

where  denotes the average over all realizations of the disorder. Moreover, the joint probability distribution of the energy values of two different microscopic configurations of the spins,  and  factorizes:

 

It can be seen that the probability of a given spin configuration only depends on the energy of that state and not on the individual spin configuration.

The entropy of the REM is given by

 

For , the system remains "frozen" in a small number of configurations of energy  and the entropy per spin vanishes in the thermodynamic limit.

References

Statistical mechanics